The Valley Christian Schools (VCCS) are private Christian schools located in Dublin, California, US. Valley Christian Schools offers a college preparatory education to students ranging from preschool through twelfth grade.

Facilities
Valley Christian's Science center and a Performing Arts center were constructed in 2014.

Notable alumni
 Nate Boyer- Former National Football League Long Snapper for the Seattle Seahawks

References

External links
 

Christian schools in California
Schools accredited by the Western Association of Schools and Colleges
Private K-12 schools in California
Private preparatory schools in California
Dublin, California
Bay Counties League East
1982 establishments in California